TRNASer (uridine44-2'-O)-methyltransferase (TRM44) is an enzyme with systematic name S-adenosyl-L-methionine:tRNASer (uridine44-2'-O)-methyltransferase. This enzyme catalyses the following chemical reaction

 S-adenosyl-L-methionine + uridine44 in tRNASer  S-adenosyl-L-homocysteine + 2'-O-methyluridine44 in tRNASer

The 2'-O-methylation of uridine44 contributes to stability of tRNASer(CGA).

References

External links 
 

EC 2.1.1